A statue of former professional basketball player Bill Russell by Ann Hirsch is installed outside Boston's City Hall, in the U.S. state of Massachusetts. The bronze sculpture was unveiled in 2013, and subsequent statues have been added to the memorial.

References

External links
 Behind the scenes of the making of Bill Russell's statue (May 8, 2018), NBC Sports

2013 establishments in Massachusetts
2013 sculptures
Bronze sculptures in Massachusetts
Government Center, Boston
Monuments and memorials in Boston
Outdoor sculptures in Boston
Sculptures of African Americans
Sculptures of men in Massachusetts
Sculptures of sports
Statues in Boston